Samia Fikri (born 2 August 1999) is a French-born Moroccan footballer who plays as a midfielder for Division 2 Féminine club Montauban FCTG and the Morocco women's national team.

Club career 
Fikri is a product of En Avant Guingamp. She has played for US Saint-Malo, ESOF Vendée La Roche-sur-Yon and Montauban in France.

International career
Fikri made her senior debut for Morocco on 30 November 2021 as a starter in a 2–0 friendly home win over Senegal.

See also
List of Morocco women's international footballers

References

External links 

1999 births
Living people
Citizens of Morocco through descent
Moroccan women's footballers
Women's association football midfielders
Morocco women's international footballers
Footballers from Rennes
French women's footballers
En Avant Guingamp (women) players
US Saint-Malo players
Montauban FCTG players
Division 2 Féminine players
French sportspeople of Moroccan descent